Melissa F. Olson is an American author, primarily in the urban fantasy genre. She is best known for her "Old World" books, which consist of the Scarlett Bernard series, the Boundary Magic series, a number of short stories, and two novellas. The first Old World book, Dead Spots, has been optioned by Sony. She is also the author of Nightshades, a Tor.com novella that is unrelated to her other urban fantasy books. In addition, Olson has published a P.I. mystery with no fantasy elements called The Big Keep.

Biography 
Melissa Olson was born and raised in Chippewa Falls, Wisconsin, and studied film and literature at the University of Southern California in Los Angeles. After graduation, Olson worked briefly for NBC-Universal as well as Warner Bros Studios before moving to Madison, WI. In addition to fiction, her work has been published in the Daily Trojan, the Chippewa Falls Herald Telegram, Litreactor.com, The International Journal of Comic Art, The La Crosse Tribune, U-Wire, Women on Writing.com, and the compilation Images of the Modern Vampire. She also teaches writing classes.

Convention Presence 
Olson is a frequent presenter at science fiction and fantasy conventions in the U.S, where she speaks on issues related to genre, feminism, and film, among others.

Bibliography

Old World stories 

 Companion Pieces (short story collection, 2018)

Scarlett Bernard 
 Dead Spots (2012)
 Trail of Dead (2013)
 Hunter's Trail (2014)
 "Bloodsick" (short story, 2014)
 "Sell-By Date" (short story, 2014)

Boundary Magic / Allison "Lex" Luther 
 Boundary Crossed (2015)
 Boundary Lines (2015)
 Boundary Born (2016)
 Boundary Broken (2019)
 Boundary Haunted (forthcoming, December 3, 2019)
 "Malediction" (short story, 2015)
 "Boundary Blood" (short story, 2018)

Disrupted Magic 
 Midnight Curse (2017)
 Blood Gamble (2017)
 Shadow Hunt (2018)
 Born Magic The Diary Of Scarlett Bernard (2020)
 "Nativity" (short story, 2018)

Lena Dane Mysteries
 The Big Keep (2014)

Nightshades
 Nightshades (2016)
 Switchback (2017)
 Outbreak (2018)

References

External links 
 

USC School of Cinematic Arts alumni
Year of birth missing (living people)
Living people
American fantasy writers
American women writers